Love After Lockup is a reality television series, chronicling the lives of recently released felons and their significant others. It premiered on January 12, 2018, on We TV.

Production
On December 7, 2017, We TV announced that Love After Lockup would premiere January 12, 2018. On February 9, 2018, the show was picked up for a second season, which premiered on December 7, 2018. On January 23, 2019, We TV extended the second season with additional episodes. These episode began airing from June 14, 2019, under the title Love After Lockup: Life After Lockup, which acts as a spin-off of the show.

On July 19, 2019, We TV announced that the second season of Love After Lockup would return with another batch of episodes from August 16, 2019. Both Love After Lockup and Love After Lockup: Life After Lockup were renewed for a second and third season respectively on November 20, 2019. On November 22, 2019, We TV announced that season two of Love After Lockup: Life After Lockup would air from January 3, 2020. On August 19, 2020, it was announced that the third season would premiere on September 11, 2020.

On June 25, 2020, it was announced that the third season would premiere on July 17, 2020.

On October 1, 2021, a new spin-off of the series, Love During Lockup, was announced. It premiered in January 2022.

On March 4, 2022, the fourth season premiered.

On February 24, 2023, the fourth season premiered Love After Lockup: Life After Lockup

Cast

Couples

Episodes
While the show's first season is listed consistently as such, episode listings of its subsequent seasons vary. For season two, We TV separates the season into two parts in their official listings, but also includes the two seasons of the spin-off Love After Lockup: Life After Lockup in their episode count. iTunes splits the season into four volumes, while Amazon Prime list them separately as "2", "202", "203" and "204" respectively. The second part of season two has also been referred to as "season 3" by some media outlets and non-American digital platforms.

Series overview

Season 1 (2018)

Season 2 (2018–20)

Season 3 (2020–22)

Season 4 (2022-TBA)

Notes

References

External links
 

2018 American television series debuts
2010s American reality television series
2020s American reality television series
English-language television shows